

Columbia and Capitol Records: 1941–1946
In her earliest recordings, Anita O'Day was the featured vocalist with the big bands of Gene Krupa (1941-1942 and 1945-1946) and Stan Kenton (1944). In the 1940s, Columbia and Capitol Records released the recordings of Krupa and Kenton, respectively, on 78 rpm disks with one song per side. In later decades the tracks were anthologized in albums in other media.

With Stan Kenton
Stan Kenton Classics (Capitol, 1944-47 [1952])
The Kenton Era (Capitol, 1940-54, [1955])

Signature, Coral, Advance, Alto, Mercury Records: 1946–1951
In her first years as a solo act, Anita O'Day recorded several dozen live and in-studio songs, including ten tracks produced by Bob Thiele in Fall 1947 for the Signature label.

Clef and Norgran Records: 1951–1956
Anita O'Day sang with small and large studio ensembles for the Clef and Norgran labels formed by Norman Granz.

Verve Records: 1956–1964
This time period brought O'Day to the attention of the Jazz world, making 14 records. O'Day became the first artist to record for Norman Granz's newly formed Verve Records.

BASF/MPS Records: 1970
Spending several years kicking her drug and alcohol habit, O'Day re-emerged onto the music scene in 1970.

Emily Records,(Emily Productions) : 1975–NOW
O'Day named Emily Records after her dog in 1975. This time period would document her strong comeback, with her first studio recordings, since  leaving Verve Records in 1963. Most of her recordings in the 1970s would take place in Japan, as jazz became popular in the country.

Dobre Records

 
Discographies of American artists
Vocal jazz discographies